Paul Haddad (May 20, 1963 – April 11, 2020) was a Canadian actor. He was the original voice-actor of Leon S. Kennedy in the Resident Evil franchise, voicing the character in Resident Evil 2 (1998). Other voice-over-roles included Uncle Arthur on Babar (1989-1991), Quicksilver and Arkon on X-Men (1992–1996), Luke Talbot on Monster Force (1994), the title character on Free Willy (1994-1995), and Lefty on John Callahan's Quads! (2000–2002).

Early life
Haddad was born in Birmingham, England on May 20, 1963. He was the eldest of three children. Haddad attended McGill University, where he studied acting. In 1988, he graduated from the National Theatre School of Canada, in Montreal, Quebec.

Career
Haddad performed in the Stratford Theater Festival in Stratford, Ontario for two years. In the 1996 festival, he played Bassanio in The Merchant of Venice.

Haddad voiced Uncle Arthur on Babar (1989–1991) and Shrimplips on Medabots (2001–2002).

Haddad's voice-roles include Quads, Mythic Warriors, Cyberchase, The Adventures of Super Mario Bros. 3, Little Bear, The Magic School Bus, RoboRoach, Pearlie, Franny's Feet, The Adventures of Tintin, and Rupert.

In 1995, Haddad played Gerald Schulze, Edward Schulze's (Matt Frewer) brother who runs the local market in the DisneyToon Studios animated comedy film BugHunt.

He voiced Willy Stop in the animated series Rescue-Heroes.

Haddad was best-known for voicing Leon S. Kennedy in the video-game Resident Evil 2. Due to the popularity of his voice-work in Resident Evil 2, Haddad was asked to voice a character in the similarly themed Daymare: 1998. Haddad's role in Resident Evil 2 led to him becoming an "icon" among the game's fanbase according to Gamasutra.

Personal life and death
Haddad resided in Toronto, Canada until his death. His hobbies included film editing (preferably videos of his dog) and assisting with actor-demos. He had stated on a YouTube live-stream that he had stage three throat-cancer and had a tumor growing on one of his vocal cords; however, the tumor was surgically removed, altering his voice in the process.

In February 2020, Haddad set up a GoFundMe requesting $2,000 for his third neurosurgery. He detailed his personal and financial struggles in a complementing Facebook post, which revealed he has had obsessive–compulsive disorder for most of his life. Although Haddad had been managing the disorder through a deep brain stimulation (DBS) device, the device was removed in 2019 due to an infection, causing his battle with OCD to resume.

Two months after creating the fundraiser, Haddad died on April 11, 2020, at the age of 56. The cause of death was not publicly disclosed.

Filmography

Film

Television

Video games

References

External links
 
 

1963 births
2020 deaths
Canadian male film actors
Canadian male television actors
Canadian male video game actors
Canadian male voice actors
Canadian people of Iranian descent
English emigrants to Canada
Male actors from Birmingham, West Midlands
Male actors from Toronto
20th-century Canadian male actors
21st-century Canadian male actors